The glider aerobatics tournaments at the 2017 World Games in Wrocław was played between 21 and 22 July. 11 glider aerobatics competitors, from 8 nations, participated in the tournament. The air sports competition took place at Szymanów Airport in Szymanów.

Competition format
Final: The 11 Glider aerobatics competitors perform four rounds; the top three divers win the gold, silver and bronze medals accordingly.

Schedule 
All times are Central European Summer Time (UTC+2)

Results

Medalists

References
Summary of Tasks

External links
 Result on IWGA website

Glider aerobatics